The Ville Resort-Casino (formerly Jupiters Hotel and Casino and The Sheraton Breakwater Hotel and Casino) is the only casino in Townsville, Queensland.
The hotel has 194 hotel rooms.

References

External links
 

1986 establishments in Australia
Casinos completed in 1986
Hotels established in 1986
Buildings and structures in Townsville
Casinos in Queensland
Casino hotels
Hotels in Townsville
Tourist attractions in Queensland
Townsville CBD